Romain Joy Kouakou Esse (born 13 May 2005) is an English professional footballer who plays as a winger for Millwall.

Career
Esse is a youth product of Millwall, and impressed in his first senior appearance in a cameo in a friendly against Brøndby in November 2022. He made his professional debut with Millwall as a late substitute in a 2–0 EFL Championship win over Watford on 26 December 2022. On 19 January 2023, he signed his first professional contract with the club and was promoted to their senior team for the rest of the season.

Personal life
Born in England, Esse is of Ivorian descent.

References

External links
 

2004 births
Living people
English footballers
English people of Ivorian descent
Millwall F.C. players
English Football League players
Association football wingers